Rock the House Live! is a live album released by the American hard rock band Heart in 1991. It was recorded at The Centrum, Worcester, MA, USA on November 28, 1990. The band performed a set of 22 songs (including "The Way Back Machine" guitar solo by Howard Leese); but only 14 were used on the album, missing most of their recent successful singles "These Dreams", "Never", "Alone", "What About Love", "All I Wanna Do Is Make Love to You" and their classic "Crazy on You", trying to demonstrate that Heart wasn't a band of ballad hits, but instead an arena rock staple. Instead of filling the album either with their early hard rock hits or their later pop ones, it is instead composed of less familiar songs from recent albums (six from Brigade, one from Bad Animals, two from Heart and one from Passionworks), it marked a sharp decline in sales after a period of success that began in 1985 with the release of the self-titled Heart.

The live version of "You're the Voice" was released as a single performing moderately well, reaching #20 on the US Mainstream Rock chart, whilst it was a minor hit in the UK reaching #56. The studio version was recorded in 1989 as part of the sessions for the Brigade album, and finally included on Greatest Hits: 1985–1995 album in June 2000.

Track listing

Personnel
Heart
Ann Wilson – lead vocals, flute, autoharp
Nancy Wilson – backing vocals, guitars (acoustic, electric and resonator), harmonica, mandolin
Howard Leese – lead guitar, keyboards, mandolin, backing vocals
Mark Andes – bass guitar, 12-string acoustic guitar, backing vocals
Denny Carmassi – drums

Production
Richard Erwin – producer, live engineer
David Hewitt, Phil Gitomer, Sean Webb, Roger Binette – live engineers
Stanley Johnston – post-production engineer
Mike Clink, Ed Thacker – mixing at Can-Am Recorders
Jeff Poe – mixing assistant

Charts

Album

Singles

References

Heart (band) live albums
1991 live albums
Capitol Records live albums